Chaudhary Yashpal Singh ( – 12 December 2015) was an Indian politician and Member of Parliament of India. He was a member of the 8th Lok Sabha and has also been a member of the Uttar Pradesh Legislative Assembly several times. Singh represented the Saharanpur constituency of Uttar Pradesh. Yashpal Singh was  National Vice President of the Samajwadi Party political party. However, he represented the Indian National Congress during the 8th Lok Sabha.

Early life and education

Chaudhary Yashpal Singh was born in a Gurjar family of Saharanpur district of Uttar Pradesh state. His highest attained education is twelfth grade.

Political career
Singh was active in politics since the 1950s. He first became MLA from Nakur in 1962, the same year that another person named Yashpal was elected to Lok Sabha from Kairana. He was initially associated with Indian National Congress and was a member of the Lok Sabha in 1980s, apart from being a Member of Legislative Assembly and Cabinet Minister in State of Uttar Pradesh several times. In early 2000s, Singh joined Bharatiya Janata Party followed by Rashtriya Lok Dal in first week of Jan. 2012; only to join Samajwadi Party in another two weeks. He was the Vice President of Samajwadi Party.

Death 
Singh died aged 94 at Escorts Hospital in Delhi on 12 December 2015.

Posts held

See also

Lists of members of the Lok Sabha of India
Politics of India

References 

1920s births
2015 deaths
India MPs 1984–1989
Lok Sabha members from Uttar Pradesh
People from Saharanpur district
People from Saharanpur
Rashtriya Lok Dal politicians
Samajwadi Party politicians
Members of the Uttar Pradesh Legislative Council
Uttar Pradesh MLAs 1962–1967
Uttar Pradesh MLAs 1974–1977
Uttar Pradesh MLAs 1977–1980
Uttar Pradesh MLAs 1980–1985
Bharatiya Janata Party politicians from Uttar Pradesh
Indian National Congress politicians from Uttar Pradesh